Applied Solar Inc. is a company developing solar energy products and energy management applications—especially with photovoltaics for buildings. The company is located in California.

History
In 2005, Barnabus Energy Inc., which was founded in 2002, acquired 20% of Solar Roofing Systems (SRS). After that, the company changed from developing oil and natural gas projects in Western Canada to the new technology of renewable energy under the name Open Energy Corp.. Senior Scientific Advisor was Dr. Melvin L. Prueitt who was theoretical physicist at the Los Alamos National Laboratory for more than 30 years. In 2004 the share price was listed with more than 25 US$ in the NASDAQ, but declined in the following years. As the solar energy is still the main target, the company decided to change its name to Applied Solar in 2009.

The largest investor is The Quercus Trust with about 10 percent.

Applied Solar filed for Chapter 11 in 2002, converted to Chapter 7 in 2010 and sold its assets (no disbursement in connection with the liquidation went to shareholders).
The company had $17.6 million in assets and $29 million in liabilities. It sold its assets to the Quercus Trust, the secretive investment firm run by David Gelbaum. Quercus earlier loaned money to Applied. No distribution was made to shareholders other than Quercus. The officers of Applied Solar have reopened as OneRoof Energy, Inc., dba ORE Solar.

References

Solar energy companies of the United States
Photovoltaics manufacturers
Engineering companies of the United States
Companies based in San Diego County, California
2005 establishments in California